Deadline Games A/S was a Danish video game developer based in Copenhagen, operating between 1996 and 2009. Its last published game was Watchmen: The End Is Nigh, based on Watchmen.

On 29 May 2009, Deadline Games filed for bankruptcy, only a few months after releasing Watchmen: The End Is Nigh. The company has previously been reported to have been struggling to find new projects and a publisher for its co-op shooter, .

List of games
Blackout
CrossTown: Giften
CrossTown: Englen
Globetrotter
Globetrotter 2
In the City
On the Farm
Suspect
The Angel
The Poison
Desert Rat
Blowback
Total Overdose: A Gunslinger's Tale in Mexico
Chili Con Carnage
Pantera
Watchmen: The End Is Nigh
 (cancelled)
Total Overdose 2: Tequila Gunrise (cancelled)
Killing Pablo Escobar (cancelled)
Shadow Hunter (cancelled)

References 

Defunct companies based in Copenhagen
Video game companies established in 1996
Video game companies disestablished in 2009
Defunct video game companies of Denmark
Video game development companies